Millington is an unincorporated community in Coos County, Oregon, United States. It lies along U.S. Route 101 slightly south of the city of Coos Bay. Isthmus Slough, which flows into Coos Bay, passes by Millington. Millington has a Coos Bay mailing address.

References

Unincorporated communities in Coos County, Oregon
Unincorporated communities in Oregon